The 337th Infantry Regiment was a National Army Infantry Regiment first organized for service in World War I as part of the 85th Division.  It later served in the Mediterranean Theater during World War II.  Since then it has served as a training Regiment, training Army Reserve and Army National Guard Soldiers for service in support of the Global War on Terror.

Service history

World War I
 The regiment was constituted 5 August 1917 in the National Army as the 337th Infantry and assigned to the 169th Infantry Brigade of the 85th Division. It was organized at Camp Custer, Michigan, on 30 August 1917.  Its initial commander was Walter Cowen Short. In August 1917, the regiment was organized with 3,755 officers and enlisted men:
 Headquarters & Headquarters Company- 303
 Supply Company- 140
 Machine Gun Company- 178
 Medical & Chaplain Detachment- 56
 Infantry Battalion (x3)- 1,026
 Headquarters- 2
 Rifle Company (x4)- 256
The Doughboys of the regiment deployed to France as part of the American Expeditionary Forces and were billeted in the cities of Nevers and Cosne.  The regiment didn't participate in any named campaigns during the war; its Infantrymen were used as individual replacements for divisions already fighting on the Western Front. After completing its war service in France, it arrived at the port of New York on 2 April 1919 aboard S.S. Leviathan.  The division demobilized at Camp Custer on 23 April 1919.

Between the Wars
 The regiment was reconstituted in the Organized Reserves as the 337th Infantry on 24 June 1921 and reassigned to the 85th Division (later redesignated as the 85th Infantry Division) in the Sixth Corps Area. It was organized in December 1921 with the Regimental Headquarters and the 1st and 2d Battalions at Grand Rapids and the 3rd Battalion at Sault Ste Marie, Michigan.  The 2nd and 3rd Battalions relocated by 1929 to Muskegon and Cadillac respectively.  The regiment conducted summer training most years with the 2d Infantry Regiment at Camp Custer. In 1928 the regiment conducted summer training with the 126th Infantry Regiment at Camp Grayling. In 1934 the regiment conducted summer training with the 125th Infantry Regiment at Camp Grayling.  They also conducted infantry Citizens Military Training Camp (CMTC) training some years at Camp Custer or Fort Brady, as an alternate form of summer training. The primary ROTC feeder school was Michigan State College of Agriculture and Applied Science.

World War II

The regiment was ordered into active military service 15 May 1942 and reorganized at Camp Shelby, Mississippi, using a cadre provided by the 2nd Infantry Division. The regiment participated in the #2 Louisiana Maneuvers in April 1943 and the Desert Training Center #3 California Maneuvers in June 1943.
In July 1943, the regiment was organized with 3,256 officers and enlisted men:
 Headquarters & Headquarters Company- 111
 Service Company- 114
 Anti-Tank Company- 165
 Cannon Company- 118
 Medical Detachment- 135
 Infantry Battalion (x3)- 871
 Headquarters & Headquarters Company- 126
 Rifle Company (x3)- 193
 Weapons Company- 156
It departed Hampton Roads Port of Embarkation aboard HMS Andes on 24 December 1943, landed in Casablanca, North Africa on 2 January 1944 and received amphibious warfare training at Port aux Poules.  It arrived in Naples, Italy on 27 March 1944. The 337th participated in the Rome-Arno, North Apennines, and the Po Valley campaigns in the Mediterranean Theater as part of the Italian Campaign.  The regiment usually fought as a Regimental Combat Team with the addition of the 328th Field Artillery Battalion, Company A, 310th Engineer Battalion and Company A, 310th Medical Battalion attached.  The regiment saw heavy combat attacking the German's Gustav and Gothic Lines as they moved north up the Italian Peninsula during Operation Diadem.  The regiment initially held defensive positions north of the Garigliano River until it attacked and seized Castellonorato until it was stopped by German resistance south of Monte Campese on 16 May 1944.  The regiment began a drive on Terracina on 21 May that on the 24th opened the road to the Anzio beach head.  Over the next month, the regiment fought through Monte Artemisio and Lariano. In June the 337th captured Monte Ceraso and advanced to the Viterbo River before being relieved on 10 June 1944.  The regiment relieved the 2nd New Zealand Division on the Arno River Line on 16 August. On 17 August the 337th seized Mount Pratone.  By 18 September, the division had penetrated the Gothic Line.  On 1 October, Sergeant Chris Carr of Company L earned the Medal of Honor for actions near Guignola, Italy.  The 85th Division went on the defensive near Pizzano from 27 October through 22 November 1944. On 9 January 1945, the 85th relieved the British 1st Division near Monte Grande and then the 1st Armored Division on 17 April as part of Operation Grapeshot.  On 26 April the division crossed the Adige River in the Verona area and by 1 May was clearing the Piave Valley.  The German forces in Italy surrendered on 2 May 1945. The regiment departed Fagianeria, Italy for Hampton Roads and was inactivated at Camp Patrick Henry, Virginia, on 25 August 1945.

Post War Service
The Regiment was reconstituted on 6 November 1946 in the Organized Reserves with headquarters in the Minneapolis, Minnesota, under TOE 29-7T.  Its recruiting area was Illinois, Minnesota, South Dakota, and North Dakota.  On 31 December 1949 the Regimental Headquarters was moved to Chicago, Illinois and then to Waukegan, Illinois, on 1 August 1955.  The regiment, and its parent 85th Infantry Division belonged to the Fifth Army, headquartered in Chicago.  The 1948 organization of the regiment called for a strength of 3,774 officers and enlisted men organized as below:
 Headquarters & Headquarters Company- 289
 Service Company- 186
 Tank Company- 148
 Heavy Mortar Company- 190
 Medical Company- 214
 Infantry Battalion (x3)
 Headquarters & Headquarters Company- 119
 Rifle Company (x3)- 211
 Weapons Company- 165

Under the 85th Training Division
The 337th Infantry was redesignated as the 337th Regiment (Basic Combat Training), and reorganized to consist of the 1st, 2d, and 3d Battalions, elements of the 85th Division (Training Support) on 1 June 1959. On 31 January 1968, the Regimental Headquarters and the 3rd Battalion were inactivated.  On 1 May 1971, the 3rd Battalion was reactivated and all three Battalions were redesigned as Advanced Individual Training units.  1st Battalion was inactivated on 13 January 1995 with personnel transferred to the 2nd and 3rd Battalions.  The 1st Battalion was reactivated and allotted to the Regular Army on 17 October 1999 and assigned to the 166th Aviation Brigade at Fort Hood, Texas, with a mission to train Aviation units.

Transformation of the Army
 All Battalions are currently subordinate to the First Army and wear the First Army Shoulder Sleeve Insignia.  The 1st Battalion was assigned to the 166th Aviation Brigade and specialized in training Aviation units at Fort Hood, Texas, until it was reassigned to Fort McCoy in 2015. The 1st Battalion was responsible for training an Alaska Army National Guard aviation unit for deployment in 2010, elements of the 5th Battalion, 159th Aviation Regiment for a deployment to Iraq, as well as several units for deployment to Kosovo as part of the KFOR in 2014. The 2nd Battalion was assigned to the 205th Infantry Brigade with a mission to train Combat Support and Combat Service Support units.

Current Assignment
 As part of Operation Bold Shift, the battalion changed their missions to better train Army Reserve and National Guard units.
 The 1st Battalion is a Regular Army unit assigned to the 181st Infantry Brigade at Fort McCoy, Wisconsin, with a mission to train Brigade Support Battalions, Combat Sustainment Support Battalions, and other logistics units.  The Battalion frequently sends personnel to NTC and JRTC to train units conducting rotations.
 The 2nd Battalion is an Army Reserve unit assigned to the 157th Infantry Brigade with a mission to train Combat Support and Combat Service Support units.
 The 3rd Battalion is an Army Reserve unit assigned to the 4th Cavalry Brigade at Fort Knox, Kentucky and provides Observer, Controller/ Trainers (OC/T) and Staff to various Mobilization Training Centers responsible for conducting post mobilization training to Reserve Component units preparing them for deployment to Overseas Contingency Operations.

Campaign streamers

Decorations

Shoulder sleeve insignia
* Description: On a background equally divided horizontally white and red, 3¼ inches high and 2½ inches wide at base and 2⅛ inches wide at top, a black block letter "A", 2¾ inches high, 2 inches wide at base and 1⅝ inches wide at top, all members 7/16 inch wide, all enclosed within a 1/8 inch Army Green border.
 Symbolism:
The red and white of the background are the colors used in flags for Armies.
The letter "A" represents "Army" and is also the first letter of the alphabet suggesting "First Army."
 Background:
A black letter "A" was approved as the authorized insignia by the Commanding General, American Expeditionary Force, on 16 November 1918 and approved by the War Department on 5 May 1922.
The background was added on 17 November 1950.

Distinctive Unit Insignia

 Description/Blazon A Gold color metal and enamel device 1 5/32 inches (2.94 cm) in height overall consisting of a shield blazoned: Azure, billette Or, a wolverine sejant guardant erect Argent. Attached below and to the sides of the shield a Gold scroll inscribed "VIS ET VIRTUS" in Black letters.
 Symbolism The shield is blue for Infantry. The gold billettes are taken from the arms of Nevers, the capital of the Department of Nièvre, Cosne, the first locations where the regiment was billeted in the War Zone, being in the Department of Nievre. The wolverine represents Michigan, the location of the 337th Infantry in 1921. The motto translates to "Strength and Courage."
 Background The distinctive unit insignia was originally approved for the 337th Infantry Regiment on 16 June 1926. It was redesignated for the 337th Regiment on 8 August 1960

Coat of Arms

 Description/Blazon
 Shield: Azure, billette Or, a wolverine sejant guardant erect Argent.
 Crest: That for the regiments and separate battalions of the Army Reserve: On a wreath of the colors Argent and Azure, the Lexington Minute Man Proper. The statue of the Minute Man, Captain John Parker (H.H. Kitson, sculptor), stands on the Common in Lexington, Massachusetts.
 Motto: VIS ET VIRTUS (Strength and Courage).
 Symbolism
 Shield: The shield is blue for Infantry. The gold billettes are taken from the arms of Nevers, the capital of the Department of Nievre, Cosne, the first locations where the regiment was billeted in the War Zone, being in the Department of Nievre. The wolverine represents Michigan, the location of the 337th Infantry in 1921.
 Crest: The crest is that of the United States Army Reserve.
 Background : The coat of arms was originally approved for the 337th Infantry Regiment on 15 June 1926. It was redesignated for the 337th Regiment on 8 August 1960.

References

External links
 337th Infantry Regiment Return to Italy, 2015
 The 337th Infantry Regiment in Italy during World War II
 The 337th Infantry In World War II
 The 85th Infantry Division in World War II

Military units and formations established in 1917
337
337
337